"RICO" is the eighth episode of the first season of the AMC television series Better Call Saul, the spinoff series of Breaking Bad. The episode aired on March 23, 2015 on AMC in the United States. Outside of the United States, the episode premiered on streaming service Netflix in several countries. It is named after the Racketeer Influenced and Corrupt Organizations Act.

Plot

Opening
In a flashback, Jimmy McGill works as a mail clerk for Hamlin, Hamlin & McGill. He receives notice that he has passed the state bar exam and hopes to be hired as an attorney at HHM, but Chuck McGill provides a halting reply. During an office celebration, Howard Hamlin tells Jimmy the firm will not hire him but will re-examine his application in six months.

Main story
Jimmy is suspicious when a client mentions her nursing home, Sandpiper Crossing, controls her pension and Social Security payments while providing her a monthly allowance. Upon reviewing her invoices, Jimmy's suspicions grow and he begins collecting invoices from other residents. Jimmy and Chuck analyze them and find evidence of Sandpiper systematically overcharging residents, making the company guilty of fraud. Chuck suggests there are grounds for a class action lawsuit and encourages Jimmy to continue investigating.

Jimmy is stopped at Sandpiper Crossing's front desk, preventing him from seeing clients. He hears papers being shredded and goes to a bathroom to hastily write a demand letter on toilet paper, which informs Sandpiper to cease document destruction. He hands the letter to a manager as he is escorted out and later finds in the nursing home's dumpster plastic bags containing shredded papers. Chuck and Jimmy sort through the shreds and piece together an incriminating document. Chuck decides to become Jimmy's co-counsel, and Sandpiper's attorneys agree to a meeting.

Mike Ehrmantraut babysits Kaylee. When Stacey returns from work, she asks Mike what to do with the money from her suitcase. Mike says she should use it to do something good for herself and her daughter. Stacey says that even if she does, she will not have enough to cover living expenses. Mike returns to Dr. Caldera to follow up on Caldera's previous offer of illegal work.

Sandpiper's attorneys deny the company is defrauding residents, but concede some were overcharged. The company offers $100,000 in compensation, but Jimmy presents evidence that Sandpiper's fraud makes them eligible for a RICO case. Chuck demands Sandpiper pay $20 million to settle, which their attorneys refuse. As Chuck and Jimmy continue to prepare their case, a preoccupied Chuck casually leaves his house to retrieve documents from Jimmy's car, taking none of his usual EHS precautions. Jimmy is speechless as he watches from inside the front door, then softly calls Chuck's name. Chuck is stunned to realize where he is and drops the papers.

Production
This was the second episode written by Gordon Smith and directed by Colin Bucksey, respectively.

Reception
Upon airing, the episode received 2.87 million American viewers, and an 18-49 rating of 1.3.

The episode received a generally positive reception from critics. On Rotten Tomatoes, based on 23 reviews, it received a 96% approval rating with an average score of 7.97 out of 10. The site's consensus reads, ""RICO" introduces an intriguing fraud case while providing insightful backstory to Jimmy's unlikely beginnings as a lawyer." Roth Cornet of IGN gave the episode an 8.8 rating, concluding, "With “RICO”, Better Call Saul lays the foundation for the circumstances that will likely transform sweet(ish) Jimmy McGill into the hardened Saul Goodman." The Telegraph rated the episode 4 out of 5 stars.

Notes

References

External links
 "RICO" at AMC
 

Better Call Saul (season 1) episodes